Steven Haft is an American media executive, attorney, and film producer.

Biography
Haft was born in Manhattan and raised in Flushing, Queens, the son of Helen (née Urdang) and Nathan "Nuddy" Haft. He is a graduate of Hofstra University School of Law and is a member of The Bar of the U. S. Supreme Court. After school, Haft produced films for over twenty years including Jakob the Liar and Dead Poets Society.

In 2000, he accepted a position with AOL where he served as Vice President and Chief Strategy Officer for their $1.2 billion in sales Interactive Marketing Group. He left AOL to found the media consultancy company Indyworks, which focuses on the impact of emerging technologies on media. His clients included Comcast Cable, the Corporation for Public Broadcasting, the College Television Network, AirMedia, Edelman, and Burson-Marstellar. He presently serves as Senior Vice President of Innovation for magazine publisher Time Inc.

Philanthropy and civic service
Haft has been involved in environmental issues, human rights and arts in education since the 1970s. He served on the Board of United States variant of the TerraMar Project, which was a United Nations NGO that promoted the Clean Oceans provision of the Sustainable Development Goals program. Haft served on the board until TerraMar (US) announced that it had ended operations on July 12, 2019 after the sex trafficking charges against Jeffrey Epstein, associate of Ghislaine Maxwell, became public.

He is an Advisory Board Member of the Global Partnerships Forum, which serves as an intermediary linking business entities, government agencies, and the United Nations to develop shared goals and efforts. Haft is an elected Member of the Motion Picture Academy and Trustee Emeritus of Robert Redford's Sundance Institute; and was appointed by New York Mayor Michael Bloomberg to the Board of the Brooklyn Navy Yard Corporation. He serves as Vice Chair of the Presidential Scholars Foundation, is a STEM Advisor to the Center for the Study of The Presidency & Congress, and has done work for the John D. Rockefeller IIIrd Fund, the John Hay Whitney Foundation, the United Automobile Workers, and the ACLU. He was a co-founder of the original Earth Day in 1970.

Personal life
He is divorced from author Lisa Birnbach; they have three children. He attended the Modern Orthodox Jewish synagogue Congregation Kehilath Jeshurun in Manhattan.

Filmography
He was a producer in all films unless otherwise noted.

Film

As writer

Television

References

External links
 

1949 births
Living people
20th-century American businesspeople
21st-century American businesspeople
American film producers
American mass media company founders
20th-century American Jews
AOL people
Maurice A. Deane School of Law alumni
Filmmakers who won the Best Film BAFTA Award
Film producers from New York (state)
People from Manhattan
21st-century American Jews
Jewish American film producers